Icepeak may refer to:

 Ice Peak, a stratovolcano in British Columbia, Canada
 Ice Peak (soft drink), a soft drink from Xi'an, China
 IC3PEAK, a Russian experimental electronic band

See also
 Glacial maximum
 Ice Mountain (disambiguation)
 Icecap (disambiguation)